Rodrigo Junior Paula Silva (born 7 May 1988, in Duque de Caxias), also called Digão, is a Brazilian footballer.

Club career

Fluminense
Digão played for Fluminense between 2009 and 2013. He made his debut for the club in a draw against Náutico. He started that match and played the whole 90 minutes. In his first season with the club, he featured eight times in league matches but did not score a goal. His first match for the 2010 season was against Ceará. However, Fluminense lost it by a single goal. He played further three times for the club in league, against Atlético Goianiense, Atlético Mineiro and Vitória. He played ten times for the club in the 2011 season, without scoring a goal. During that season, he was ruled out of action for three months for sustaining an injury. On 2 November 2011, he signed a contract extension, keeping him at the club till December 2013.

In the 2012 season, Digão started fourteen matches and played a total of seventeen league matches, scoring two goals. These goals were scored against Figueirense and Grêmio. On the continental level, he played three matches in the Copa Libertadores, which included two matches against Boca Juniors and the third against Arsenal de Sarandi. On 2 June 2013, he scored a brace against Criciúma. In the 2013 season, he played the whole 90 minutes of twelve league matches and also featured four times for the side in Copa Libertadores. On 5 June 2013, he renewed his contract with Fluminense, keeping him at the club till December 2015.

Al-Hilal
In December 2013, Digão signed for Saudi Arabian club Al-Hilal for £ 6.5 million, joining former Brazilian teammate Thiago Neves. He made his debut against Al Ahli. In his debut season with the Saudi club, he played eight league matches. In the Asian Champions League, he played fourteen times. His team reached the final but lost 1–0 to Australian club Western Sydney Wanderers in the first leg. In the second leg, the clubs drew as the Australian club was crowned winner.

Return to Brazil with Cruzeiro
In July 2017, Digão was signed by Brazilian giants Cruzeiro, once again joining his former teammate Thiago Neves, who played a part in the negotiations, along with former teammates Dedé and Rafael Sóbis, who were also part of Cruzeiro's squad. Digão signed a three-year deal with the Brazilian team. This marked the defense-man return to the Brazilian Serie A after over four years playing for Middle Eastern clubs.

Club statistics

Honours

Club
Fluminense
Taça Guanabara: 2012
Rio de Janeiro State League: 2012
Campeonato Brasileiro Série A: 2010, 2012

Al-Hilal
Kings Cup: 2015
Saudi Super Cup: 2015
Saudi Crown Prince Cup: 2015–16

Buriram United
Thai League 1: 2021–22
Thai FA Cup: 2021–22

References

1988 births
Living people
Brazilian footballers
Brazilian expatriate footballers
Campeonato Brasileiro Série A players
Fluminense FC players
Cruzeiro Esporte Clube players
Al Hilal SFC players
Sharjah FC players
Buriram United F.C. players
Expatriate footballers in Saudi Arabia
Brazilian expatriate sportspeople in Saudi Arabia
People from Duque de Caxias, Rio de Janeiro
Association football central defenders
Saudi Professional League players
UAE Pro League players
Sportspeople from Rio de Janeiro (state)